Albert Leo (Alberto) van Klaveren Stork (born 27 October 1948) is a Dutch-born Chilean political scientist, lawyer and diplomat who has served as Minister of Foreign Affairs since 10 March 2023. Previously, he served as Assistant Secretary for Foreign Affairs of Chile between 2006 and 2009. Van Klaveren also represented Chile in the International Court of Justice in the case regarding the Chilean–Peruvian maritime dispute. He currently teaches at the University of Chile.

Early life
Van Klaveren's parents were Jewish World War II survivors in the Netherlands. In 1950 they decided to emigrate to Chile, bringing along their child Albert. Relatives of Van Klaveren's mother were already present in the country. 
Van Klaveren studied law at the University of Chile. He earned a further MA degree in International Studies at the Graduate School of International Studies at the University of Denver and a degree in Political Science from Leiden University.

Career
In 1972 Van Klaveren started working for the University of Chile at the Institute for International Studies and the Faculty of Law.

Between 1985 and 1992 he worked for the Institute for European-Latin American Relations, as well as the Instituto Universitario Ortega y Gasset, both located in Spain. Between 1988 and 1990 he was also an Associate Investigator at the Institute for Political Research at Heidelberg University.

In 1992 he returned to Chile where he started working for the Ministry of Foreign Affairs. He also took up his position at the Institute for International Studies again. He served as director of the institute for 18 months. Between 1996 and 2001 he was Director for Policy Planning at the Foreign Ministry. In May 2001 he was named the Chilean Ambassador to the European Union. Three years later, in 2004, the Chilean Ambassadies to the European Union, Belgium and Luxembourg merged and Van Klaveren became ambassador to all three. He served in this position until his appointment as Assistant Secretary for Foreign Affairs in 2006. He stayed on until 2009.

He became the lawyer representing Chile before the International Court of Justice in the case regarding the Chilean–Peruvian maritime dispute in 2008. After the decision in the case in January 2014 Van Klaveren stated that Chile regretted the decision of the Court.

At the University of Chile he teaches International Relations and European International Relations.

Since May 2015, he has been a board member of the U.S.-Chile Fulbright Commission.

In March 2023 he was made the Minister of Foreign affairs replacing Antonia Urrejola.

Personal life
Van Klaveren speaks Spanish, English, Dutch and some French. He is married and he has two grown up children.

References

1948 births
Living people
Dutch Jews
Chilean Jews
Chilean people of Dutch-Jewish descent
Naturalized citizens of Chile
University of Chile alumni
University of Denver alumni
Josef Korbel School of International Studies people
Leiden University alumni
Academic staff of the University of Chile
Chilean diplomats
Ambassadors of Chile to Belgium
Ambassadors of Chile to Luxembourg
Ambassadors of Chile to the European Union